Hirtomurex is a genus of sea snails, marine gastropod mollusks in the subfamily Coralliophilinae, the coral snails, within the family Muricidae, the murex snails and rock snails.

Species
Species within the genus Hirtomurex include:
 Hirtomurex filiaregis (Kurohara, 1959)
 Hirtomurex guoi Lai & B.-S. Jung, 2016 
 [[Hirtomurex isshikiensis]] (Shikama, 1971)
 Hirtomurex kawamurai (Shikama, 1978)
 Hirtomurex marshalli Oliverio, 2008
 Hirtomurex nakamurai Kosuge, 1985
 Hirtomurex oyamai Kosuge, 1985
 Hirtomurex scobina (Kilburn, 1973)
 Hirtomurex senticosus (H. Adams & A. Adams, 1863)
 Hirtomurex squamosus (Bivona Ant. in Bivona And., 1838)
 Hirtomurex tangaroa Marshall & Oliverio, 2009
 Hirtomurex taranui Marshall & Oliverio, 2009
 Hirtomurex teramachii (Kuroda, 1959)
 Hirtomurex winckworthi (Fulton, 1930)

References

 Coen, G. (1922). Del genere Pseudomurex (Monterosato, 1872). Atti della Società Italiana di Scienze Naturali, Pavia. 61: 68–71, pl. 2. note: as subgenus of Pseudomurex Monterosato, 1872
 Oliverio, M. (2008). Coralliophilinae (Neogastropoda: Muricidae) from the southwest Pacific. in: Héros, V. et al. (Ed.) Tropical Deep-Sea Benthos 25. Mémoires du Muséum national d'Histoire naturelle (1993). 196: 481-585.